Robopon Sun, Star and Moon Versions, or in Japan  are handheld role-playing video games for Nintendo's Game Boy Color. Of the three games, only Sun was released in North America on December 4, 2000 by Atlus, while their original Japan releases were by Hudson Soft. The games focus on a boy named Cody (his default name) and his adventures on his island with his robotic friends. They mostly resemble the Pokémon series of video games, but also bear similarities to the Super Nintendo Entertainment System game Robotrek, published by Enix (now Square Enix).

Story

Within Robopon Sun, Star, and Moon versions, the player assumes the role of a child named Cody, whose grandpa is retiring and gives him the family business, a Robopon Dispatching Company. Cody travels around Porombo Island collecting Robopon and battling against the "Legend 7", the top-ranked Robopon collectors on the island. Each time Cody successfully beats one of the Legend 7, he takes his or her place in the ranking system.

Gameplay

Gameplay revolves around collecting, software upgrading, equipment swapping, and battling robotic characters in a similar manner to the Pokémon game series.  To power up the Robopon, the player could add software and parts to them. Parts had varying amounts of space to store software and determined what sort of attacks the Robopon could use. For example, a Robopon could have an "Armgun" or a "Punch" part, and this software adds certain elements to the attacks. Furthermore, software could be added onto other parts, creating more powerful additions. For example, by equipping a "Thunder" software to a "Punch" part, the Robopon would be able to use "Thunderpunch". Software could also be mixed together to create special attacks - by mixing "Fire" and "Thunder" software, the Robopon would have the special move "Zapp!!". This software could also be removed. If the player did so, the attack abilities it gave the Robopon would be removed as well. Because only Sun was released in the US, not all of the original 153 Robopon were available because the others were located on the Star Version that was never produced in the US.

Robopon cartridges have an Infrared panel on their top edge that allows them to trade information using waves much like a TV or VCR remote, allowing the cartridge to react to different objects. For example, pointing a remote control at the cartridges and pressing a button might boost the Robopons stats, or open a chest within the games. This feature was called the "GB Kiss". The game included over 150 different Robopon to use, with the first 2 releases and then over 168, with the release of Moon version, though some had to be upgraded, similar to Pokémon's evolution stages. The Robopon were classified as either Arm, Move, or Boot. Arm tended to have high offense, Move were fast, and Boot had the highest stats overall. Boot Robopon could not have their parts or software changed.

Japanese Releases

While the USA only received the Sun Version, the Japanese first had the two main releases, then nearly a year later got the Moon Version, release. The Japanese version of the GB Kiss features a letter writing/sending feature, that can be accessed from the main menu, which can also send messages over the telephone. While for the USA release, only the sending Robopon feature is included on the GB Kiss. These versions are also compatible with the Japanese exclusive game Robot Ponkottsu 64: Nanatsu no Umi no Caramel with the Nintendo 64's Transfer Pak Yet another version, Robot Ponkottsu: Comic Bom Bom Special Version''', was released in Japan on December 24, 1999. 

Sequels
Two Game Boy Advance sequels were made; Robopon 2 Cross Version and Robopon 2 Ring Version, in a manner similar to that of the release patterns of different generations of Pokémon games. These games stars Cody traveling to another island but forgetting his Robopon. Subsequently, he has to find new Robopon, but instead of catching them he has to make them by finding different types of batteries and combining them in a method known as "Sparking". The game featured four-on-four battles, where all the Robopon the player had on him would battle against four opponent Robopon.

A Robopon game called Robot Ponkottsu 64: Nanatsu no Umi no Caramel was made for the Nintendo 64 but was never released outside Japan.

Manga
There were three manga series Robot Ponkots (ロボットポンコッツ), Robot Ponkots 2 (ロボットポンコッツ2), and Robot Ponkots Go! (ロボットポンコッツ豪!) created by Hataru Tamori which were all serialized in Comic Bom Bom from the late 1990s to early 2000s. They are unusually risque for children's manga, as the majority of the female characters are depicted as having enormous breasts.

Reception
The game received a 7.0 from IGN, stating that it was a decent game, but played like a clone of Pokémon''. The game received a 3 out of 5 from Nintendo Power.

References

External links

1998 video games
Atlus games
Game Boy Color games
Game Boy Color-only games
Games with Transfer Pak support
Konami franchises
Multiplayer and single-player video games
Hudson Soft games
Robopon
Role-playing video games
Video games about robots
Video games developed in Japan
Video games with alternative versions